Star Media Group (Star Medya Grubu, STAR Medya Yayıncılık A.Ş.) is a Turkish media group. Among other properties it owns the Star newspaper and the television channel Channel 24.

The company was co-founded by Ahmet Özal and Cem Uzan and was previously part of the Uzan Holding. In 2004 Star was seized by the Turkish government, along with the other assets of the Uzan Group. The paper was transferred to the TMSF, and then sold several times. It is now again part of the Star Media Group, which was acquired by Nihat Özdemir of Rixos from Ethem Sancak in 2009, with Tevhit Karakaya acquiring 50% in 2010.

In May 2013 50% of the Group was sold to Azerbaijan's SOCAR oil company.

References

External links 

Star Media Group

Mass media companies of Turkey
Küçükçekmece
Mass media companies established in 1989
Turkish companies established in 1989